A. P. Shanmugasundara Goundar is  an Indian politician and former Member of the Legislative Assembly of Tamil Nadu. He was elected to the Tamil Nadu legislative assembly as a Dravida Munnetra Kazhagam candidate from Pollachi constituency in 1967, and 1971 elections A.P.Shanmugasundaram is a former Member of Legislative Assembly from Pollachi Constituency. He graduated with B.Sc ( Chemistry ) from Loyola College, Chennai. He has a daughter and a son. Now he is into doing various spiritual activities. He is a great follower of Ramanuja and Lord Krishna.

Earlier in life he used to be an atheist and follower of Dravidar Kazhagam and he was inspired by the speeches from Ex chief Minister of Tamil Nadu, CN Annadurai. Once he was working in his village he saw a small mountain near his farm so out of the curiosity he and his sub-ordinate climbed the mountain and there he found a small temple for Lord Krishna. This was the first incident happened in his life.

Then later he started studying about Ramanuja then with the help of Tamil Nadu government and well wishers he started re-construction work of the old temple in the mountain and a small temple for Ramanuja in the same foothills. Today the temple is one of the famous religious and spiritual spot in nearby villages.

References 

Dravida Munnetra Kazhagam politicians
Year of death missing
Year of birth missing